Elizabeth R. McAnarney (born May 7, 1940) is a pediatrician who is recognized for her leadership in the fields of adolescent medicine and pediatrics.

Career 
Elizabeth McAnarney was born in New York, New York and grew up in Watkins Glen, New York. She graduated from Vassar College in 1962, received the M.D. cum laude from the State University of New York Upstate Medical University in 1966, and completed her pediatric residency there. In 1968, she pursued post-residency fellowship training at the University of Rochester School of Medicine and Dentistry (Rochester, NY)). She has remained there to the present, serving as director of the Division of Adolescent Medicine for 22 years. In 1993, she became the first woman to serve as the university's chair of pediatrics, a position she held for 13 years; she also served as Acting Dean of the University of Rochester School of Medicine in 2009–2010. In 2018, she was named a Distinguished University Professor, the highest title that the university bestows on its faculty. McAnarney was the first woman to receive this honor at the University of Rochester.

McAnarney is a leader in the field of Adolescent Medicine, and long advocated for it to become a board-certified specialty, which it became in 1991. She is the editor of the Textbook of Adolescent Medicine, published in 1992. 

She was the president of the Society for Adolescent Medicine (1983-1985, first woman  president of the Association of Medical School Pediatric Department Chairs (AMSPDC) (2001-2003) and was president of the American Pediatric Society (2004-2005).

Her scholarly activities focused on the relationship of young maternal age and perinatal outcome in high-risk adolescents. She has published extensively on this topic in many national journals.

Awards and honors 
McAnarney has been recognized for her community contributions to the city of Rochester on several occasions.

References 

1940 births
Living people
American pediatricians
Women pediatricians
Vassar College alumni
State University of New York Upstate Medical University alumni
University of Rochester faculty
Scientists from New York City
People from Watkins Glen, New York
Fellows of the American Association for the Advancement of Science